Cappell is a surname. Notable people with the surname include:

Daniel Fowler Cappell (1900–1976), Scottish physician and pathologist
Sylvain Cappell (born 1946), American mathematician

See also
Capell
Cappel (disambiguation)